Diego Schoening (born August 5, 1969 in Mexico City), is a Mexican singer, actor and television host.

Schoening started his career in the band Timbiriche in 1981, where he remained until its disbanding in 1994. In Timbiriche, he recorded  19 records, performed soap operas "Acompañame" (1977),"Nosotras las Mujeres" (1981) "La Pasion de Isabela" (1984), Angélica (1985), Muchachitas (1991), Agujetas de color de rosa (1994), Confidente de secundaria (1996) and Soñadoras (1998) and participated in episodes of Mujer casos de la vida real, among others and in the movie Embrujo del rock, also he was the television host of 'Nuevas Tardes" Hoy 100% Mujer'''Super Sabado'  . In 1998 he joined with the old members of Timbiriche Paulina Rubio, Alix Bauer, Erik Rubin, Sasha Sokol, Mariana Garza and Benny Ibarra. In 1999 he released his first solo album Voy a mí. In 2007 he rejoined with Timbiriche to celebrate 25 years since the beginning of the group. In 2009 he released his second album Lo que soy.

 Filmography 

Telenovelas
 Acompañame  (1977)
 Nosotras las mujeres  (1981)
 La pasion de Isabela  (1984)
 Angélica  (1985)
 Muchachitas  (1991) As Rodrigo.
 Agujetas de color de rosa  (1994) As Tavo.
 Confidente de secundaria  (1996) As Roberto.
 Soñadoras  (1998) En el papel de Benjamín "El terco".

 TV episodes 
 Mujer casos de la vida real 
 Anabel La hora marcada Al derecho y al Derbez Papa Soltero TVO Dr. Candido Perez Mi generacion Noche a noche Mala noche no Otro Rollo Familia Peluche La vida es una cancion Lo que callamos las mujeres Si se puedeFilmography
 Embrujo del rock (1995)
 Brother Bear (2003) voice of Denahi
 Timbiriche: La misma piedra (2008)

Television
 Hoy (1998) (Host on 2000)
 100% mujer (2003) TV Host (2003–2005)
 Super Sabado (2005)(Host)
 Te regalo mi cancion (2005)(vocal coach)
 Buscando a la Nueva Banda Timbiriche (2007) (Judge)

 Discography with Timbiriche 
 Timbiriche (1982)
 La Banda Timbiriche (1982)
 La banda Timbiriche: En concierto (1983)
 Timbiriche Disco Ruido (1983)
 Que no acabe Navidad (1983)
 Timbiriche Vaselina (1984)
 Timbiriche Rock Show (1985)
 Timbiriche VII (1987)
 Quinceañera (1988)
 Timbiriche VIII & IX (1988)
 Los Clásicos de Timbiriche (1989)
 Timbiriche X (1990)
 Timbiriche 11 (1992)
 Timbiriche XII (1993)
 Timbiriche: El concierto (1998)
 Timbiriche 25 (2007)
 Somos Timbiriche 25 (2007)
 Timbiriche: Vivo en vivo (2008)

 Discography as solo 
 Voy a mí (1999)
 Lo que Soy'' (2009)

Solo singles
 Quiero Darme Tiempo (1999)
 Nena Peligrosa (1999)
 Estás dentro de mi (1999)
 Enamorado de Ti (2009)
 No Puedo (2009)
 Amar es un arte (2010)

Musical theatre
 La maravilla de crecer (1980)
 Jesucristo Superestrella (1982)
 Vaselina (1984)
 Snoopy y la Pandilla (2000)
 Francisco (2002)
 Ana Verdad? (2003)
 Timbiriche el musical (2010)

Spoke celebrity for commercials and advertising campaigns
 Ace Procter & Gamble From 2001 to this date
 Codet Aris Vision (2003)
 Nokia Timbiriche special edition (2007-2008)
 Umano Cards (2011)

Motivational speaker
Conferencias pareja Congreso internacional Gente Nueva
Congreso Familia DIF Cd Victoria Tamps
Primer congreso valores juveniles monclova
“Influencias positivas y negativas en la juventud”
GIRA DE LA GRAN CRUZADA “LÁNZATE” CONTRA LAS ADICCIONES, SI QUIERES… ¡ SI PUEDES!
XVII Congreso Internacional Gente Nueva 2006 “Sin Mascaras”
Homenaje a Juan Pablo II Puebla, PueblaChetumal, Qroo
Encuentro de valorES Sonora
Master de Liderazgo Gente Nueva
Congreso Teleton, Edo de Mex, Guadalajara, Irapuato, Tampico, Coahuila
Campaña Presidencial Felipe Calderon
Congreso Reynosa

References 

1969 births
Mexican male telenovela actors
Mexican male television actors
Mexican male singers
Timbiriche members
Living people
Male actors from Mexico City
Singers from Mexico City
Mexican Jews
Mexican people of German-Jewish descent